Tsimiroro is a large oil field in the onshore Morondava Basin of Madagascar found south of the Bemolanga ultra heavy oil field and south of the town of Morafenobe. The oil is found in the Isalo and Amboloando formations.

Madagascar Oil is the license holder of the Tsimiroro field. It describes the field as being a heavy oil field with a significant volume of oil in place. It gives figures for oil in place (2010 estimates) as:

Madagascar Oil is working on a steam flood pilot project as well as continuing drilling operations to expand the proven reserve base. First production was realised in March 2008, a year when a total  were produced.

Notes

References 
 Tsimiroro brochure
 Madagascar Oil website
 Rigzone

External links
 Netherland, Sewell & Associates, Inc. (NSAI)
 Grafton Resources website

Oil fields of Madagascar